Elections to Liverpool City Council were held on 7 May 1970.

One third of the council was up for election.

After the election, the composition of the council was:

Election result

Ward results

* - Councillor seeking re-election

Abercromby

Aigburth

Allerton

Anfield

Arundel

Breckfield

Broadgreen

Central

Childwall

Church

Clubmoor

County

Croxteth

Dingle

Dovecot

Everton

Fairfield

Fazakerley

Gillmoss

Granby

Kensington

Low Hill

Melrose

Netherfield

Old Swan

Picton

Pirrie

Prince's Park

Sandhills

St. Domingo

St. James

St. Mary's

St. Michael's

Smithdown

Speke

Tuebrook

Vauxhall

Warbreck

Westminster

Woolton

Aldermanic Elections

Twenty of the forty Aldermen were elected by the city council on 18 May 1970.
Those elected by the council and the wards they were allocated to are shown in the table below:

References

1970
Liverpool City Council election
City Council election, 1970
Liverpool City Council election